Lieutenant Colonel Daniel Burges, VC, DSO (1 July 1873 – 24 October 1946) was an English recipient of the Victoria Cross, the highest and most prestigious award for gallantry in the face of the enemy that can be awarded to British and Commonwealth forces.

Biography
Burges was educated at Winchester College. He was commissioned on 21 October 1893 as a second lieutenant into the Gloucestershire Regiment, and was promoted to lieutenant on 8 July 1897. Following the outbreak of the Second Boer War in late 1899, Burges was with the 2nd battalion of his regiment as they were sent to South Africa in January 1900. He participated in the Relief of Kimberley, operations in the Orange Free State, actions at Poplar Grove, Driefontein, Vet River, Zand River, the operations in the Transvaal, Rhenoster Kop, operations in Orange River Colony and in Cape Colony. For his service in the war, he received the Queen's South Africa Medal with four claps, and the King's South Africa Medal with two clasps. Burges stayed in South Africa until the end of the war in June 1902, and returned to Southampton on the SS Orcana in November 1902.

Burges was promoted to captain on 25 October 1903. From 1908 to 1913 he was adjutant of the Punjab Volunteer Rifles. At the start of World War I he was with the 2nd Battalion, Gloucestershire Regiment with which he served at the Second Battle of Ypres where he was wounded and Mentioned in dispatches. After recovering from his wound he was appointed Temporary Lieutenant-Colonel to command the 10th (Service) Battalion, East Yorkshire Regiment (the 'Hull Commercials') on 11 November 1915. The battalion had just arrived at Fovant on Salisbury Plain to undergo intensive battle training with 31st Division before embarking for service overseas. It served in Egypt, guarding the Suez Canal from December to February 1916, when it was transferred to the British Expeditionary Force on the Western Front.

Over forthcoming weeks the battalion took its turn in the routine of trench holding, working parties, patrolling and trench raiding. The 10th Battalion was to be in support of 31st Division's assault on the first day of the Battle of the Somme (1 July). It held the front line trenches during the British bombardment in the days leading up to the battle, suffering significant casualties from the German counter-bombardment (about 100 killed and wounded for 10th Bn alone).

It is alleged that Lt-Col Burges was removed from his command the day before the battle for refusing to risk any more men after two failed attempts to recover the body of an officer (son of a well-known politician) from No man's land during the bombardment. Burges left 10th Bn East Yorks on 30 June to become an instructor at the Senior Officers' School. In September 1917 Burges took command of the 7th Bn South Wales Borderers at Salonika.

Award
He was 45 years old, and a temporary lieutenant-colonel in The Gloucestershire Regiment commanding the 7th (S) Battalion, The South Wales Borderers, British Army, during the First World War at the Battle of Doiran when the following deed took place for which he was awarded the VC.

In retirement Burges served as Resident Governor and major of the Tower of London from 1 July 1923 to 1 July 1933. He later joined the British Fascists. He moved to Durdham Down, near Bristol, and from 1943 to 1945 he was county director of the British Red Cross.

A marble plaque was unveiled at Arnos Vale Cemetery, Bristol, on 24 October 2006 (which was 60 years to the day after he died) by Les Turner.

Family
Burges married Katherine Blanche Fortescue, second daughter of the late Captain Edmund Fortescue of the Rifle Brigade, in 1905. They had no children, and she died in 1931. In 1932 he married Mrs Florence Wray Taylor, daughter of the late W.G. Cox of Nutgrove, Rathfarnham, Dublin.

Notes

References
 David Bilton, Hull Pals, 10th, 11th 12th and 13th Battalions East Yorkshire Regiment – A History of 92 Infantry Brigade, 31st Division, Barnsley: Pen & Sword, 2014, .

 Martin Middlebrook, The First Day on the Somme, 1 July 1916, London: Allen Lane 1971/Fontana, 1975, .

 Alan Wakefield and Simon Moody, Under the Devil's Eye: Britain's Forgotten Army at Salonika 1915–1918, Stroud: Sutton, 2004, .

External links
Location of grave and VC medal (Avon)

1873 births
1946 deaths
Military personnel from London
South Wales Borderers officers
East Yorkshire Regiment officers
British Army personnel of the Second Boer War
British Army personnel of World War I
British World War I recipients of the Victoria Cross
Companions of the Distinguished Service Order
Recipients of the Croix de Guerre 1914–1918 (France)
Gloucestershire Regiment officers
Recipients of the War Cross (Greece)
British Army recipients of the Victoria Cross
People educated at Winchester College
British fascists